These are the songs that reached number one on the Top 50 Best Sellers chart (expanded to 60 on April 13, 1957) in 1957 as published by Cash Box magazine.

See also
1957 in music
List of number-one singles of 1957 (U.S.)

References

1957
1957 record charts
1957 in American music